Kevin G. Volpp is an American behavioral economist and Mark V. Pauly President's Distinguished Professor at the University of Pennsylvania’s Perelman School of Medicine and the Wharton School. He is the Director of the Penn Center for Health Incentives & Behavioral Economics (CHIBE)..

Education
Volpp earned his bachelor’s degree magna cum laude in biology from Harvard and was a Rotary Scholar at Freie Universitat in Berlin, Germany. He earned an MD from the University of Pennsylvania’s Perelman School of Medicine and a PhD from the Wharton School from the graduate group in Applied Economics and Managerial Science.

Appointments
Volpp is the Division Chief of the Health Policy Division of the Department of Medical Ethics and Health Policy at the Perelman School of Medicine. For 20 years, he also served as an attending physician at the Philadelphia VA Medical Center and worked as a part-time primary care clinician and hospitalist.

Research
Volpp’s research applies principles of behavioral economics to improve health and health care. One study led by Volpp was a large randomized trial of financial incentives and smoking cessation among employees at General Electric. Long-term quit rates from a $750 incentive were approximately three times higher in the intervention group. The main trial paper led GE to implement a benefit design change based on this study to its 150,000 US employees. Follow-up work extended this among employees at CVS and also demonstrated a tripling in long-term smoking cessation rates and led to a national program among CVS employees called “700 Good Reasons.” This was followed by a large-scale study of financial incentives and smoking cessation that found that offering standard pharmacologic therapies and e-cigarettes were no more effective than control whereas either gain- or loss-framed incentives tripled smoking cessation rates among employees of 54 different employers

His team has also conducted studies examining the impact of behavioral economic strategies on increasing physical activity, medication adherence, and on physician behavior.

Volpp’s research group also conducted a number of national evaluations of the 2003 and 2011 national duty hour regulations, the first to regulate work hours for physicians in the United States in a series of papers published in JAMA.

Awards and honors

References 

Living people
Year of birth missing (living people)
Harvard College alumni
Perelman School of Medicine at the University of Pennsylvania alumni
Perelman School of Medicine at the University of Pennsylvania faculty
21st-century American economists
Behavioral economists
20th-century American economists
20th-century American physicians
21st-century American physicians
Members of the National Academy of Medicine